The American Civil Defense Association (TACDA) is a member-supported, 501(c)(3) nonprofit, civil defense-focused organization founded in 1962.  Its primary focus is to educate its membership on emergencies, both man-made and natural disasters through various resources.  The organization operates the free TACDA Academy and prints a periodical called Journal of Civil Defense.  TACDA also sells emergency supplies, such as dosimeters, water purification equipment, emergency rations, CERT equipment, and Mettag Triage Tags.

In a letter dated October 19, 1988, then sitting president Ronald Reagan praised the work of TACDA.

References

External links
 

Emergency services in the United States
United States civil defense
1962 establishments in the United States
Disaster preparedness in the United States
Non-profit organizations based in Utah
501(c)(3) organizations